is a Quasi-National Park in Kumamoto Prefecture and Miyazaki Prefecture, Japan. The park includes Aya Biosphere Reserve in its territory.

See also

 List of national parks of Japan

References

National parks of Japan
Parks and gardens in Kumamoto Prefecture
Parks and gardens in Miyazaki Prefecture
Protected areas established in 1982
1982 establishments in Japan